Billy Galvin is a 1986 American drama film directed by John Gray. It stars Karl Malden and Lenny von Dohlen.

Cast
Karl Malden as Jack Galvin
Lenny von Dohlen as Billy Galvin
Joyce Van Patten as Mae Galvin
Toni Kalem as Nora
Alan North as George
Keith Szarabajka as Donna

References

External links

1986 films
1986 drama films
American drama films
Films directed by John Gray (director)
1986 directorial debut films
Vestron Pictures films
American Playhouse
1980s English-language films
1980s American films